Jeruzal  is a village in the administrative district of Gmina Mrozy, within Mińsk Mazowiecki County, Warszawa Voivodeship, in central Poland. It was probably founded in the 13th century.

In 2004, the village had a population of 410.

References

External links
Jeruzal in (Polish)

Jeruzal